Pond herons (Ardeola) are herons, typically  long with an  wingspan. Most breed in the tropical Old World, but the migratory squacco heron occurs in southern Europe and the Middle East and winters in Africa. The scientific name comes from Latin ardeola, a small heron (ardea).
 
These pond herons are stocky species with a short neck, short thick bill, typically buff or brownish back, and coloured or streaked fore neck and breast. In summer, adults may have long neck feathers. Ardeola herons are transformed in flight, looking very white due to the brilliant white wings.

Their breeding habitat is marshy wetlands. They nest in small colonies, often with other wading birds, usually on platforms of sticks in trees or shrubs. Two to five eggs are laid.

These herons feed on insects, fish and amphibians. They are often found on small ponds giving rise to the English name shared by most of the species.

Species

References

 
Herons